Nouvelles de l'estampe (in French : "News about prints") is a scholarly journal on prints (etchings, engravings, lithography, etc.). It is published by the Comité national de la gravure française and its office is at the prints department of the Bibliothèque nationale de France, which sponsors the journal. The journal is abstracted and indexed in the Bibliography of the History of Art and the Bibliographie de l’histoire de France.

History
The journal was established in 1963 by Jean Adhémar, then curator of the prints department of the National Library. At that time, it was not a journal but just a few sheets presenting news on prints. Michel Melot, also a curator of the prints department, became editor in 1971 initiated the change to a scholarly journal, publishing studies on either old prints or contemporary creations. Part of the journal still presents news about exhibitions, new publications, etc.

Editors-in-chief 
The editors-in-chief of the journal:
 1963–1971: Jean Adhémar
 1971–1982: Michel Melot
 1982–1988: Marcelle Elgrishi-Gautrot
 1988–1991: Marianne Grivel
 1991–2010: Gérard Sourd
 2010–present: Rémi Mathis

References

External links 
 

1963 establishments in France
Art history journals
Prints (art)
Publications established in 1963
French-language journals
5 times per year journals